The 9th constituency of Haute-Garonne is a French legislative constituency in the Haute-Garonne département. Like the other 576 French constituencies, it elects one MP using a two round electoral system.

It was created in 2010, with the first election in 2012. It consists of the
Canton of Portet-sur-Garonne, part of the Canton of Toulouse-9 and the
Cantons of Toulouse-10 and 11.

Deputies

Election Results

2022

 
 
 
 
 
 
 
 
|-
| colspan="8" bgcolor="#E9E9E9"|
|-

2017

2012

References

9